Mistaria zorica is a species of spider in the family Agelenidae. It is native to Central and East Africa. It was first described by Strand in 1913 as Agelena zorica, and transferred to the genus Mistaria in 2018.

References

Agelenidae
Spiders of Africa
Spiders described in 1913